The Bretton Woods Agreements Act 1945 (c 19) was an Act of Parliament that ensured UK government funding for the International Monetary Fund, and the World Bank as part of the United Nations from the consolidated fund.

Contents
Preamble
s. 1 Effect of signature of Bretton Woods agreements.
s. 2 Financial provisions.
s. 3 Other matters.
s. 4 Short title.

See also
International law
UK constitutional law
Bretton Woods Conference

Notes

Laws in the United Kingdom
International Monetary Fund
United Kingdom Acts of Parliament 1945
World Bank